Mașcăuți is a village in Criuleni District, Moldova.

See also
Mashkautsan

References

Villages of Criuleni District